Pultenaea daena is a species of flowering plant in the family Fabaceae and is endemic to an area near Ravensthorpe in the south-west of Western Australia. It is a dense, prostrate, domed shrub with flat, hairy leaves and yellow flowers.

Description
Flowering occurs in March and the fruit is a pod.

Taxonomy and naming
Pultenaea daena was first formally described in 2005 by L.A. Orthia and Jennifer Anne Chappill in Australian Systematic Botany from specimens collected west of Ravensthorpe in 1997. The specific epithet (daena) is the name of the Zoroastrian goddess Daena, owing to the colour of the flowers and its half-buried habit.

Distribution
This pultenaea grows on plains, near salt lakes and in disturbed areas near Ravensthorpe in the Coolgardie and Mallee biogeographic regions of south-western Western Australia.

Conservation status
Pultenaea daena is classified as "Priority Three" by the Government of Western Australia Department of Parks and Wildlife, meaning that it is poorly known and known from only a few locations but is not under imminent threat.

References

daena
Eudicots of Western Australia
Plants described in 2005